Gavdul-e Gharbi Rural District is in the Central District of Malekan County, East Azerbaijan province, Iran. At the National Census of 2006, its population was 19,256 in 4,880 households. There were 20,762 inhabitants in 5,731 households at the following census of 2011. At the most recent census of 2016, the population of the rural district was 17,573 in 5,368 households. The largest of its 13 villages was Tazeh Qaleh, with 4,058 people.

References 

Malekan County

Rural Districts of East Azerbaijan Province

Populated places in East Azerbaijan Province

Populated places in Malekan County